Tom Clancy's Net Force Explorers or Net Force Explorers is a series of young adult novels created by Tom Clancy and Steve Pieczenik as a spin-off of the military fiction series Tom Clancy's Net Force. The first novel was published in 1998. In 2025, the Internet and its virtual reality network have to be policed by the Net Force to prevent cyber-terrorists from sabotaging it. They are assisted by the Net Force Explorers, a young people's auxiliary for computer experts who have completed a rigorous training program.

Characters
The explorers include Maj (Madeline) Green, David Gray, Matt Hunter, Mark Gridley, Leif Anderson, Andy Moore, Megan O'Malley, Catie, and Charlie Davis, and are led by former Marine commander Captain James Winters. The young people solve cyber-crimes and defeat international terrorists while creating virtual worlds and playing high-tech computer games.

Novels
While Clancy and Pieczenik are credited as the creators of the series, they didn't write any of the books. Their names would be the ones you saw on the cover, but the co-authors name's in the cover's fine print. Some frequent authors were Diane Duane, Bill McCay, and Mel Odom.

References

See also
NetForce (film)

Book series introduced in 1998
Novel series
Techno-thriller novels